The following is a list of the 67 municipalities (comuni) of the Metropolitan City of Genoa, Liguria, Italy.

List

See also 
List of municipalities of Italy

References 

 01
Metropolitan City of Genoa
Genoa